St. Nicholas Cathedral is an Eastern Orthodox church that serves as the main cathedral of the Metropolis of Korea. It is located in Ahyeon-dong, Mapo District, Seoul, South Korea.

History 
The first temple in honor of Saint Nicholas, built for the needs of the Russian Ecclesiastical Mission in Korea, was consecrated on 17 April 1903 in central Seoul. The church was destroyed during the Korean War.

The current Byzantine-style cathedral was built in 1968 thanks to the Greek soldiers of the UN mission, who raised funds for the construction. In the temple there are two icons that were brought by the first Russian missionaries: Theotokos of Tikhvin and Seraphim of Sarov.

In early December 2018, Bartholomew I visited Korea for the fourth time as Patriarch to commemorate the 50th anniversary of the St. Nicholas Cathedral.

References

External links

Eastern Orthodoxy in South Korea
Buildings and structures in Seoul
Churches in Seoul
Eastern Orthodox cathedrals
Rebuilt buildings and structures in South Korea
Churches completed in 1968
20th-century Eastern Orthodox church buildings
20th-century churches in South Korea